Andrew Judd is a New Zealand local government politician and activist. He won the mayoralty of New Plymouth from one-term incumbent Harry Duynhoven with a resounding 9,206 vote majority in 2013 and served one term before announcing he would not stand again in 2016.

Māori wards

In 2014 Judd caused controversy when he and his council supported the establishment of a special Māori ward in New Plymouth in a move intended to increase Māori representation, lift Iwi participation in council decision-making and fulfill Treaty of Waitangi obligations. Judd also called for all councils in New Zealand to have up to 50% Māori representation. The proposals were widely criticised by politicians and the media, with New Zealand First leader Winston Peters calling arguments for the ward "childish nonsense"  and right-wing media personality Mike Hosking labelling Judd "completely out of touch with middle New Zealand". In the months following a publicly-initiated referendum on the creation of a Māori ward, which Judd lost in a landslide, the Mayor spoke to media about "a man in a Nazi uniform" coming to see him, getting removed as a patron of a club, being abused walking down the street in a Santa parade and being spat on whilst out with family at a local supermarket. Judd, a New Zealand European, labels himself a "recovering racist".

However, Judd gained the admiration and recognition of notable political figures, including MP Marama Fox who called for his critics to apologise in a general debate speech before parliament. Support for Judd also flowed on social media, with a Facebook group named "Andrew Judd Fan Club" reaching 10,500 members.

References

Year of birth missing (living people)
Living people
Mayors of New Plymouth
Māori Party politicians
21st-century New Zealand politicians